Jang Jae-hyun (born 1981) is a South Korean film director and screenwriter.

Education and career
After graduating from Sungkyunkwan University's Department of Film, he graduated from the Department of Film at Hanyejong Film Institute. Jang served as an assistant director on the blockbuster period drama Masquerade (2012) before breaking out with the short 12th Assistant Deacon (2014) which won Best Film in The Extreme Nightmare section at the 13th Mise-en-scène Short Film Festival, and Best Director Award (Korean Competition For Shorts) at the 15th Jeonju International Film Festival in 2014. Based on the award-winning short, he made his first feature film The Priests (2015) - a supernatural mystery thriller, which was a hit with more than 5.4 million admissions. Jang said "I got a weird feeling when I saw a priest waiting anxiously for someone on the other side of a fast food restaurant window. The Priests started then."

Filmography 
 Maley from India (short film, 2009) - director  
 Bus (short film, 2010) - director 
 Themselves (2011) - assistant director, script editor
 S.I.U. (2011) - assistant director
 Masquerade (2012) - assistant director, actor
 12th Assistant Deacon (short film, 2014) - director, screenwriter
 The Priests (2015) - director, screenwriter
 House of the Disappeared (2017) - screenwriter
 Svaha: The Sixth Finger (2019) - director, screenwriter

Awards 
 2014 15th Jeonju International Film Festival: Best Director Award (12th Assistant Deacon)
 2016 16th Director's Cut Awards: Best New Director (The Priests)

References

External links 
 
 
 

1981 births
Living people
South Korean film directors
South Korean screenwriters
Sungkyunkwan University alumni
Korea National University of Arts alumni